Westella & Willerby Football Club is an English football club based in Willerby, East Riding of Yorkshire, they play their home games at Hill Top, Willerby.

History
Westella & Willerby was formed in 1920, although the club's website indicates that teams were playing under the banner of Westella & Willerby in around 1910–11. They played in the East Riding County League for many decades and in 2000–01 they were founder members of the Humber Premier League and spent eight seasons in that league, their most successful campaign seeing the club finish as runners-up in the 2006–07 season. In 2008 they joined the Central Midlands League and immediately gained promotion from the Premier Division to the Supreme Division following a second-place finish. In 2011, the League was reorganised and the club was placed in the North Division, winning the League in the 2011–12 season but ground grading issues prevented the club from being promoted to the Northern Counties East League. For the 2012–13 season the club changed its name to Westella Hanson and also made its debut in the FA Vase, changing its name again, in 2014, to Westella VIP due to a sponsorship deal. The following year, after seven seasons in the Central Midlands League, the club was promoted to the Northern Counties East League. The club name reverted to Westella & Willerby for the 2016/17 season. The club was relegated from the Northern Counties East League after the 2017/18 season and joined the Humber Premier League.

Honours
Central Midlands League North Division
Champions 2011–12
Runners-up 2013–14, 2014–15
Central Midlands League Premier Division
Runners-up 2008–09
Humber Premier League
Runners-up 2006–07

Records
FA Vase
First Qualifying Round 2012–13, 2013–14
Second Qualifying Round 2016-2017

References

External links
 Official club Website

Football clubs in England
Football clubs in the East Riding of Yorkshire
Northern Counties East Football League
Central Midlands Football League
East Riding County League
Humber Premier League